Naya Roop Nayi Zindagi is a reality television show that aired on Sony TV, from May 1, 2008 to July 3, 2008. The show was an Indian version of the American show Extreme Makeover. It is anchored by Mona Singh, popularly known as Jassi.

Concept 
The 10-week reality show consists of 10 candidates who undergo facial correction surgeries — reconstructive and cosmetic, dental and eye surgeries combined with fitness, diet and styling. Each story is about the skin deep transformation and a completely new change in life. It is a journey equivalent to getting a new life, from styling to fitness and counseling to dream fulfillment. In the 10 weeks ordinary people, through the medium of TV, meet extraordinary experts who work with them to help them reach their full physical and emotional potential.

Naya Roop Nayi Zindagi was directed by Bimal Unnikrishnan for Miditech on behalf of Sony Entertainment Television. The script narrator was Rajiv Pandey.

References

External links 
Official Site on Sony TV
Naya Roop Nayi Zindagi on Miditech

Sony Entertainment Television original programming
Indian reality television series